Josef de Souza Dias (born 11 February 1989), sometimes known as just Souza, is a Brazilian professional footballer who most recent played as a midfielder for Turkish club Beşiktaş.

Career statistics

Honours
Vasco da Gama
Campeonato Brasileiro Série B: 2009

Porto
UEFA Europa League: 2010–11
Primeira Liga: 2010–11, 2011–12
Taça de Portugal: 2010–11
Supertaça Cândido de Oliveira: 2010, 2011

Beşiktaş
Süper Lig: 2020–21
Turkish Cup: 2020–21
Süper Kupa: 2021

Brazil
Superclásico de las Américas: 2014

Individual
 Campeonato Brasileiro Série A Team of the Year: 2014
Süper Lig Midfielder of the Year: 2020–21

References

External links
 
 Josef de Souza at Netvasco
 
 

1989 births
Living people
Brazilian footballers
Footballers from Rio de Janeiro (city)
Association football midfielders
Brazil youth international footballers
Brazil under-20 international footballers
Brazil international footballers
CR Vasco da Gama players
FC Porto players
Grêmio Foot-Ball Porto Alegrense players
São Paulo FC players
Fenerbahçe S.K. footballers
Al-Ahli Saudi FC players
Beşiktaş J.K. footballers
Süper Lig players
Campeonato Brasileiro Série A players
Primeira Liga players
Saudi Professional League players
Brazilian expatriate footballers
Expatriate footballers in Portugal
Brazilian expatriate sportspeople in Portugal
Expatriate footballers in Turkey
Brazilian expatriate sportspeople in Turkey
Expatriate footballers in Saudi Arabia
Brazilian expatriate sportspeople in Saudi Arabia
UEFA Europa League winning players